Jelbang, also known as Jailwang,  is a Nepalese village development committee in Rolpa District of the Rapti Zone, and is situated at the Southern Part of the Jaljala Mountain.  it had a population of 2896 people living in 510 individual households.  The town is populated by Magars.

History

Nepalese Civil War 
Jelbang was used by Maoist rebels during the Nepalese Civil War as a military base where they trained recruits. In 2003, government forces sent in helicopters which heavily bombed Jelbang, killing large amounts of people. At least 68 people from Jelbang died during the war, including 30 who died in the village itself. Almost all died at the hands of the police or military This was the highest amount of killings during the war, and are now known as the Jelbang Killings. In commemoration of the killings, Jailwang has been described as a "Model Peace Village" and a "Village of Martyrs".

Postwar Nepal 
In 2020, an Article in Nagarik reported that a defunct Mine in Jelbang would be converted into a Museum. Local Authorities hope it may boost Tourism in Jelbang.

References

Populated places in Rolpa District

Nepalese Civil War